Christian Hausmann (born 21 November 1963) is a retired German football player.

Honours
 UEFA Europa League winner: 1987–88

References

External links
 

1963 births
Living people
German footballers
Association football midfielders
Füchse Berlin Reinickendorf players
Bayer 04 Leverkusen players
1. FC Nürnberg players
Hertha BSC players
UEFA Cup winning players
Bundesliga players
2. Bundesliga players